Peter Wuteh Vakunta is an author, literary theorist, poet, and professor, noted for his work in and on hybrid languages, including Camfranglais, Cameroonian Creole, linguistic indigenization, and multilingual educational systems. He is originally from Bamunka-Ndop, in the Northwest Region of the Republic of Cameroon, and currently teaches French language and literature and serves as Chair of the Department of Modern Languages at the University of Indianapolis.

Biography 
Peter Wuteh Vakunta is a naturalized American citizen with roots in Cameroon. He immigrated to the United States in 2001, after serving as a senior translator at the Presidency of the Republic of Cameroon in Yaounde. He earned his bachelor's degrees in Cameroon and Nigeria, as well as his MA and MS degrees in the US and Cameroon. In 2009, Vakunta received a Ph.D. in French and Francophone Studies with a minor in linguistics from the University of Wisconsin Madison where he taught courses in the Theory of African Literature, Contemporary African Fiction, and Intensive English Language. Vakunta is married with five children.

Camfranglais 
Vakunta is fluent in English,French, Hausa, and Creole (Cameroon), Camfranglais, and Bamunka.  He has lived and worked in France, Cameroon, South Africa, Nigeria and the United States of America. In his capacity as study abroad coordinator, he has traveled with hundreds of students to France, Canada, Italy, Finland, Estonia, Spain, Cameroon, and South Africa.  Vakunta writes expertly in all the aforementioned languages. He also writes in and about Camfranglais, a hybrid language largely based on French syntax and vocabulary that has served as a language of resistance in Cameroon since surfacing in the 1970s. Vakutna has written poetry and critical works in Camfranglais, including a recent biographical work on Lapiro de Mbanga.

Vakunta's research focuses on African Studies, canonical questions bordering on the translation of postcolonial francophone literature; it makes explicit the working of the creative impulse in the interface between original writing and its translation into global Frenches. Vakunta's teaching interests border on interdisciplinarity as a locus for discourse on challenging habits of thought; crossing borders in educational globalization; curriculum and instruction; second language acquisition, intercultural skills development, post-coloniality and translational theories. He has had scholarly articles published in the following peer-reviewed journals: Meta 53.4 (2009); Translation Review 73 (2007); Tropos 34 (2008); Journal of the Midwest Modern Language Association (2009); Chimères (2010); Journal of African Literature Association (2009, 2010); Miniatures 58 (2011), and African Literature Today 29 (2011).

Vakunta has authored the following fictional works in Camfranglais and Pidgin English:
 Requiem pour Ongola en camfranglais: une poetique camerounaise, 2015; 
 Tori shweet for Cameroon Pidgin English,2015; 
 Poems from Abakwa in Cameroon Pidgin English, 2015; 
 Takembeng and other Poems from Abakwa,2015; 
 Speak Camfranglais pour un renouveau ongolais,2014; 
 Cam Tok and Poems from the Cradle, 2010,and
 Majunga Tok: Poems in Pidgin English, 2008.

Indigenization of language 
In 2011, Vakunta released a work on literary theory exploring linguistic indigenization in African literature and its implications for literary criticism as well as translation theory. Indigenization, within this context, is defined as "the African writer's attempt at negotiating linguistic and cultural spaces in a bid to infuse literary works with the worldview, imagination and sensibilities of indigenous cultures." Analyzing the works of Nazi Boni, Ahmadou Kourouma, and Patrice Nganang, Vakunta concludes that "indigenization of language constitutes the single most effective tool with which postcolonial African writers attempt to individualize the use of the French language," calling for further research into the controversial aspects of language usage in postcolonial literature.

In 2014, Vakunta released yet another seminal work on linguistic hybridization titled Camfranglais: The Making of a New Language in Cameroonian Literature This work  
addresses the emergence of a hybrid code in Cameroon and its usage as a narrative canon in francophone literature. In order to transpose the speech patterns and idiolects of ordinary Cameroonians into fictional writing, creative writers consciously manipulate the French language in an attempt to reflect the socio-cultural realities of the writing context. Linguistic 'miscegenation' has engendered what has come to be referred to as a third code that poses enormous problems for readers and translators not acquainted with the Cameroonianisms that constitute the substratum on which this language is formed. When creative writers resort to Camfranglais as a literary medium they do so in a bid to superimpose the speech particularisms and value systems of Cameroonians upon a foreign language—in the case of Cameroon, French.

In 2016, Vakunta published his first voluminous work on translation theory and practice titled Critical Perspectives on the Theory and Practice of Translating Camfranglais Literature.

Vakunta's short stories and poems have appeared in scores of poetic and short anthologies in the United States, Europe and Africa. As part of his cross-disciplinary inquiry, he has conducted four insightful interviews published as follows: "Lapiro de Mbanga in His Own Words: An Interview with Dr. Peter Vakunta," in Postnewline (2012); "Legalese as a New Literary Canon in African Literature: An Interview with Benjamin Kwakye," in The Entrepreneur (2010); "The Ramifications of Linguistic Innovation in African Literature: An Interview with Patrice Nganang," in Palapala Review (2009),and "The Pragmatics of Poetic Translation: Interview with Poetic Translator, David Scheler in The Entrepreneur (2009). He has organized panels at conferences where his students have presented scholarly papers with him. The latest conference where this happened was the panel titled "The Nuts and Bolts of Translation Theory and Practice in the 21st Century" at the Cross-Pollination II Conference hosted by the University of Indianapolis on March 24, 2017. Six of his students were presenters on this panel.Two of his students presented well-researched papers during the 2014 Summer Research Institute at his university.

Symposia and colloquia constitute the backbone of Vakunta's research enterprise. He has chaired several panels and presented scores of well-researched papers at the Modern Language Association, Midwest Modern Language Association, African Literature Association, African Studies Association and the American Literary Translators Association. He is a  novelist, poet, short story writer and essayist. Here are the titles of his most recent publications:  Magnum Opus: A Tribute to Ntarikon (2017);  Gravitas: Poetic Conscientcism  for Cameroon(2016); Critical Perspectives on the Theory and Practice of  Translating Camfranglais Literature ( 2016); Stream of Consciousness: Poetics  of  the Universal (2015); Poems from Abakwa in Cameroon Pidgin English(2015);  Tori Shweet for Cameroon Pidgin English(2015);  Takumbeng and Other Poems from Abakwa (2015);  Camfranglais: The Making of a New Language in Cameroonian Literature (2014); Nation at Risk: A Personal Narrative of the Cameroonian Crisis (2012); Nouvelles du Cameroun (2011); Les douleurs de la plume noire (2010); Martyrdom and Other Freedom Poems (2010); Indigenization of Language in the African Francophone Novel: A New Literary Canon. (2010); Nul n'a le monopole du français: deux poètes du Cameroon Anglophone (2010) Cam Tok and Other Poems from the Cradle (2010); Paradise of Idiots (2010) Straddling the Mungo: A Book of Poems in English and French (2009) and No Love Lost (2008). All these books are available on amazon.com

A significant proportion of Vakunta's scholarly work is devoted to the production of Open Educational Resources(OER), notably didactic videos made available as open resources on YouTube as follows: Les mois de l'année, 2014; Les jours de la semaine, 2014; Quarters in Bamunka, 2014; Hausa for Beginners, 2013; Habits of Highly Effective Translators, 2013; Pragmatics of Learning a Second Language, 2012; Un mariage de convenance, 2012; La raison est nègre, 2012; Bamunka Jumpstart, 2012; Le sophisme senghorien, 2012;Hausa Haiku, 2012; Seven Strategies for Mastering Target Language Grammar, 2012; Seven Strategies for Mastering Foreign Language Vocabulary, 2012; Seven Habits of Highly Effective Listeners, 2012; Seven Habits of Highly Critical Readers, 2012; Stress Management Strategies for Foreign Language Learners, 2012; Days of the Week in Bamunka, 2012;Counting in Bamunka, 2012; Snow in Bamunka, 2012, and Camfranglais around the Mungo, 2012.

Selected works

Books
Magnum Opus: A Tribute to Ntarikon, 2017 

Critical Perspectives on the Theory and Translation of Camfranglais Literature, 
2016 

Gravitas: Poetic Consciencism for Cameroon, 2016 

Tori shweet for Cameroon Pidgin English, 2015 

Poems from Abakwa in Cameroon Pidgin English, 2015 

Takembeng and other Poems from Abakwa, 2015 
	
Stream of Consciousness: Poetics of the Universal, 2015 

Requiem pour Ongola en camfranglais: une poetique camerounaise, 2015 

Camfranglais: The Making of a New Language in Cameroonian Literature, 2014

The Life and Times of a Cameroonian Icon: Tribute to Lapiro de Mbanga Ngata Man, 2014

Speak Camfranglais pour un renouveau ongolais, 2014

Nation at Risk: A Personal Narrative of the Cameroonian Crisis, 2012

Nouvelles du Cameroun, 2011

Les douleurs de la plume noire, 2010

Martryrdom and Other Freedom Poems, 2010

Indigenization of Language in the African Francophone Novel: A New Literary Canon, 2010

Nul n'a le monopole du français: deux poètes du Cameroon Anglophone, 2010

Cam Tok and Other Poems from the Cradle, 2010

Paradise of Idiots, 2010

Straddling the Mungo: A Book of Poems in English and French, 2009

No Love Lost, 2008

Majunga Tok: Poems in Pidgin English, 2008

Ntarikon: Poetry for the Downtrodden, 2008

Grassfields Stories from Cameroon, 2008

Cry My Beloved Africa: Essays on the Postcolonial Aura in Africa, 2008

Green Rape: Poetry for the Environment, 2008

Better English: Mind Your P's & Q's: A Guide to Effective Communication for English Second Language Speakers, 2007 (ASIN B008VGFTYC)

The Lion Man and Other Stories, 2005

A Lexicon of French and English Terms and Expressions Used in Parliamentary Proceedings, 2004

Glossaire anglais-français des termes et expressions relatifs aux élections et aux techniques d'observation des elections, 2003

Lexique Français-Anglais des termes et expressions à l'usage des parlementaires, 2003 (ASIN B00KIDQ3BO)

A French-English Lexicon of Terms and Expressions relating to Voting and Election Monitoring, 2000

Kindle Books 

Anatomy of Translation: Unpacking Code-switching in Camfranglais Poetry, Amazon Digital   Services, 2016

Toyi-Toyi Poetry in Pidgin English from Southern Cameroons, Amazon Digital    Services, 2015

Summum Bonum: Poetics of the Common Good. Amazon Digital Services, 2015

Translation Handbook Vol. 1: Lexique françcais-anglais des termes et expressions à l'usage des parlementaires. Amazon Digital Services, 2014

Ngata Man: Tribute to a Fallen Hero (Lapiro de Mbanga). Amazon Digital Services, 2014

From Pidgin to Camfranglais: The Making of a New Language in Cameroon. Amazon Digital Services, 2014

Fossoyeurs des états bananiers. Amazon Digital Services, 2014

Afritude ou tigritude. Amazon Digital Services, 2014

Carnet d'un retour au pays natal en camfranglais. Amazon Digital Services, 2014
 
Pedagogical Aspects of Environmentalism,Amazon Digital Services, 2013

A Review of Cameroonian Literature in English Vol.1, Amazon Digital Services, 2013

Emerging Perspectives on the Translation of Hybridized Literatures, Amazon Digital Services, 2013

Bate Besong: Why the Caged Bird Sings, Amazon Digital Services, 2013

Nuts and Bolts of Second Language Acquisition, Amazon Digital Services, 2013

Ntarikon: Where Rainstorms Gather. Amazon Digital Services, 2013

Méditations poétiques en camfranglais. Amazon Digital Services, 2013

Camfranglais: The Making of a New Language in the Cameroonian Nouveau Roman. Amazon Digital Services, 2013

Cry of the Environment, Amazon Digital Services, 2013

Clando Republic and Other Scrolls, Amazon Digital Services, 2013

A l'école de la rue. Amazon Digital Services, 2013

Yaounde: Autopsy of a Nation. Amazon Digital Services, 2013

Audible Palimpsests in the Francophone African Novel, Amazon Digital Services, 2013

Crossing the Threshold: Essays and Criticisms, Amazon Digital Services, 2013

Stories from the Grassfields of Cameroon, Amazon Digital Services, 2012

L'écrivain africain à la croisée des langues, Amazon Digital Services, 2012

Rite of Passage and Other Stories, Amazon Digital Services, 2012

Traduire ou Trahir? The Task of Translating Temps de Chien by Patrice Nganang. Amazon Digital Services, 2012

A Novel of Subversion: Code-switching in Temps de chien by Patrice Nganang. Amazon Digital Services, 2012

Carton rouge à Paul Biya, President de la République du Cameroun: Lapiro's Songs of Protest (Vol.1). Amazon Digital Services, 2012

Recueil de mots d'esprit, Amazon Digital Services, 2012

Subversion of the Francophone Novel: Bwamufication of French in Crépuscule des temps anciens by Nazi Boni. Amazon Digital Services, 2012

Slanguage and Other Freedom Poems, Amazon Digital Services, 2012

Fox Cities and Other Poems, Amazon Digital Services, 2012

La raison est nègre (poésie), Amazon Digital Services, 2012

Amour en deux langues (poésie), Amazon Digital Services, 2012

Poésie sous l'arbre à palabre d'Afrique, Amazon Digital Services, 2012

Barrel of the Pen, Amazon Digital Services, 2012

Divine Therapy: Inspirational Poetry. Amazon Digital Services, 2012

How Europe Underdeveloped My Homeland, Amazon Digital Services, 2012

Brotherhood of the Jungle, Amazon Digital Services, 2012

The Art of the Township Bard, Amazon Digital Services, 2012

The African Writer at the Crossroads of Languages, Amazon Digital Services, 2012

Son of the Soil, Amazon Digital Services, 2012

Tales from My Folks, Amazon Digital Services, 2012

Mind your P's and Q's: Effective Communication Guide. Amazon Digital Services, 2012

Articles in peer-reviewed & online journals 

"Tyranny of the Majority in Biya's Cameroon," Pambazuka, July 2017https://www.pambazuka.org/democracy-governance/tyranny-majority-biya%E2%80%99s-cameroon. Accessed July 6, 2017

"False Start or Decapitated Revolution in Southern Cameroons," Postnewsline.  Accessed December 11, 2016 from http://www.postnewsline.com/2016/12/-false-start-or-decapitated-revolution-in-southern-cameroons.html

"Time for the Demilitarization of British Southern Cameroons," Postnewsline.  Accessed November 23, 2016 from  http://www.postnewsline.com/2016/11/-time-for-the-demilitarization-of-british-southern-cameroons.html

"Seeds of the Cameroonian Popular Revolution," Pambazuka, October 20, 2016

"Pogroms in the Rainbow Nation's Prison-House of Political Dwarfs," Pambazuka, August 11, 2016

"Translation or Treason: On Translating the Third Code," Translation Journal 17.4, 2013

"Camfranglais: The Making of a New Language in Fouda's Je Parle Camerounais and Fonkou's Moi taximan," The Journal of the Midwest Modern Language Association 44.2 (Fall 2013), 162-8

"Dissent as a Higher form of Patriotism," Pambazuka 623 (2013)

"Aporia: The Manichaean Stigmatization of Africa," Postnewsline. Accessed November 21, 2013 from http://www.postnewsline.com/peter-vakunta

"Aspects of Highly Effective Literary Translations: A Pedagogical Perspective," Postnewsline. Retrieved October 6, 2013

"The Task of the Cameroonian Intellectual," Postnewsline, Retrieved June 3, 2013 from http://www.postnewsline.com/peter-vakunta

"Bate Besong: Why the Caged Bird Sings" Postnewsline, Accessed May 21, 2013 from http://www.postnewsline.com/peter-vakunta

"Fela's Rebel Afrobeat: A Pedagogical Perspective," Journal of African Literature Association 6.2 (Spring 2012) 1-11

"The Francophone Novel of Africa and the Caribbean: A Teacher's Perspective," Teaching African Literature Today, 29 (2011)

"Aporia: Ngugi's Fatalistic Logic on the Position of Indigenous Languages in African Literature," Journal of African Literature Association 5.2 (2010):74-81

"The Francophone Writer at the Crossroads of Languages," Chimères 31 (2010):1-14

"Critical Perspectives on the Francophone Novel of Africa and the Caribbean," Journal of the Midwest Modern Language Association 42.1 (2009):163-178

"On Translating Camfranglais and Other Camerounismes," META 53.4 (2009): 942-947

"Ramifications of Linguistic Innovation in African Literature: An Interview with Patrice Nganang," Journal of African Literature Association 3.2 (2009): 205-212

"Poète francophone du Cameroun," Tropos 35(2009):58-65

"Pidgin: Cameroon's Lingua Franca or Continental Creole?" Postnewsline. Accessed August 15, 2009 from http://www.postnewsline.com/peter-vakunta

"In Praise of Camfranglais and Other Africanisms," PanAfrican Visions 21. Accessed April 2009 from http://www.panafricanvisions.com

"Crossing the Threshold of Poverty in Africa,"PanAfrican Visions 20, Retrieved March 3, 2009 from http://www.panafricanvisions.com

"In Black and White: Reflections on Africa's Success Story," PanAfrican Visions 19, Accessed February 23, 2009 from http://www.panafricanvisions.com

"Poète francophone du Cameroun." Tropos 35(2009):58-65.

"Literary Post-colonialism: Indigenization in the Francophone Text," Tropos 34 (2008):66-89

"On the Importance of Translation: An Interview with Steven Stewart." Accessed December 10, 2008 from https://www.youtube.com/user/LiteraryTranslation

"Discourse on Gender in Africa," PanAfrican Visions 18, Accessed December 2008 from http://www.panafricanvisions.com

"Balkanized Continent, Fragmented Nation-States," PanAfrican Visions 15. Accessed October 2008 from http://www.panafricanvisions.com

"Africa's Tragedy of the Commons," Pan African Visions 14 Accessed September 2008 from http://www.panafricanvisions.com

"Le problème de l'Afrique," Codesria Bulletin 3-4(2006):34-35

"On Translating Camfranglais and Other Camerounismes," META 53.4 (2009):   942-947

"The Trouble with Africa," CODESRIA Bulletin 3-4 (2006): 32-34

References 

Year of birth missing (living people)
Living people
University of Wisconsin–Madison College of Letters and Science alumni
University of Indianapolis faculty
Cameroonian academics
Cameroonian expatriates in the United States